Gyrostemon racemiger is a plant in the family Gyrostemonaceae. It was first described in 1909 by Hans Paul Heinrich Walter.

It is native to Western Australia.

Description
Gyrostemon racemiger is a pyramid shaped  shrub growing up to 3 m. Its branchlets are orange-pink and glaucous, and the uncrowded leaves are terete. It has swollen stipules  which are dark brown but pale at the apex. The flowers occur as axillary racemes, with the male inflorescence having up to 14 flowers, and the female up to 8.  The rounded seeds are attached at the base and have prominent transverse ridges, with an aril which extends up to half-way up seed..

References

External links
Gyrostemon racemiger: Occurrence data from the Australasian Virtual Herbarium

Plants described in 1909
Gyrostemonaceae